Miodrag Perišić (born 28 August 1972) is a Serbian professional basketball coach, who currently serves as the head coach of Al Ittihad Alexandria of the Egyptian Basketball Super League (EBSL).

Coaching career
Born in Belgrade, SR Serbia, SFR Yugoslavia (now Serbia), Perišić started coaching Crvena zvezda youth system. In 1999, he became the first head coach of newly established club Avala Ada. In 2004, Perišić became the head coach of U Cluj-Napoca in Romania.

The 2018–19 season with Timișoara of the Romanian Liga Națională. On 6 December 2018, he departed from Timișoara. On 28 July 2020, he signed to become the head coach of the Qatar national team. On January 1, 2019, Perišić signed with Beirut Club of the Lebanese Basketball League. He led the team to two finals of the Arab Club Basketball Championship in 2018 and 2019.
In 2020, Perišić signed to become the head coach of US Monastir of the Tunisian Championnat National A and the Basketball Africa League (BAL). On 28 May 2022, he won the 2022 BAL Finals with Monastir.

Perišić signed with Al Ittihad Alexandria in Egypt in June 2022. He was sacked after four months after Al Ittihad was eliminated in the quarterfinals of the 2022 Arab Basketball Championship. He rejoined US Monastir shortly after.

National team coaching career
In 2020, Perišić coached the Qatar men's national basketball team.

Honours
US Monastir
BAL champion (2022)
Championnat National A: (2022)
Tunisian Basketball Cup: (2022)
Beirut Club
Arab Club Basketball Championship runners-up: (2018, 2019)
Manama
Bahraini Supercup: (2016)

Head coaching record

BAL

|-
|-bgcolor=gold
| style="text-align:left;"|2022
| Monastir
|4||4||1|||| style="text-align:center;"| 2nd in Sahara Conference|||3||3||0||
| style="text-align:center;"|Won BAL Championship
|-

References

1972 births
Living people
Basketball Africa League coaches
KK Avala Ada coaches
KK Crvena zvezda youth coaches
Serbian expatriate basketball people in Bahrain
Serbian expatriate basketball people in Egypt
Serbian expatriate basketball people in Lebanon
Serbian expatriate basketball people in Romania
Serbian expatriate basketball people in Tunisia
Serbian expatriate basketball people in Qatar
Serbian men's basketball coaches
Sportspeople from Belgrade
Zamalek SC basketball coaches
US Monastir basketball coaches

Al Ittihad Alexandria Club basketball coaches